The Envoy Apartment Building is a building located in southwest Portland, Oregon listed on the National Register of Historic Places. The building was originally apartments but was converted into condominiums in 2004.

Further reading

See also
 National Register of Historic Places listings in Southwest Portland, Oregon

References

1929 establishments in Oregon
Mediterranean Revival architecture in Oregon
Residential buildings completed in 1929
Apartment buildings on the National Register of Historic Places in Portland, Oregon
Carl L. Linde buildings
Individually listed contributing properties to historic districts on the National Register in Oregon
Southwest Portland, Oregon
Portland Historic Landmarks